The Caballas Coalition (i.e., Mackerel Coallition) was a left-wing regionalist party in the Spanish autonomous city of Ceuta in north Africa.

History
The party formed for the 2011 election as a merger between the Ceutan Democratic Union (UDCE) and the Socialist Party of the People of Ceuta (PSPC). The coalition won 4,404 votes (14.34%) in the 2011 elections, earning 4 of the 25 seats in the Ceuta Assembly, making it the second-largest party after the People's Party (PP). The coalition aims for the official recognition of Moroccan Arabic in Ceuta. The coalition, through its two member-parties, was endorsed with the Spanish Socialist Workers' Party (PSOE) until July 2013. The split came from differences of opinion over controversial comments towards women, made by a local Muslim cleric.

On 15 October 2021, the coalition announced its transformation into a platform called Ceuta Ya! (Ceuta Now!).

References

Regionalist parties in Spain
Socialist parties in Spain
Equo
Political parties in Ceuta
Berbers in Spain